Solo Mobile is a discontinued mobile virtual network operator in Canada started by Bell Mobility in 2000.  Historically, Solo was considered a discount wireless brand, offering low price monthly plans with some unlimited options in certain cities.  Its products and services were only sold in British Columbia, Alberta, Ontario and Quebec.  The brand ceased advertising towards new customers since November 2011, and new activations were officially discontinued on May 17, 2012.

Solo Mobile began migrating its prepaid customers to Bell Mobility effective July 31, 2017.

History

Early years (early 2000s)
Solo Prepaid was launched in the summer of 2000 as Bell Mobility's prepaid brand in Ontario and Quebec.  The company boasted a 1¢/minute rate.  Postpaid services were later added as well.  In 2003, the company offered a free prepaid phone and up to $45 in credits to Fido customers who traded their Fido phone and prepaid credits and switched to Solo.  A unique "Lunchtime & After School" prepaid feature was available, which offered unlimited local calling from 12h to 13h and 15h to 17h.  The brand was temporarily withdrawn from the market after the launch of Bell Mobility prepaid services.  The SoloMobile.ca domain name was registered by Bell on December 17, 2004, with the Canadian Internet Registration Authority.  It would not feature content until the following year.

Renaissance and decline (mid to late 2000s)
On June 13, 2005, content was put on the SoloMobile.ca website, but Bell waited until July 25 of that year to announce the brand via a press release.  The carrier would launch the following week, on August 1, and organized a Solo Mobile / Eckored tour that began in the middle of that month to promote its brand across the four provinces it served.  Admission was free, and the tour featured four female solo singers including Keshia Chanté.

At launch, Solo Mobile offered a very simple lineup, consisting of only one phone with two choices of plans.  The phone was the Sanyo 2300, with a flip design available in pink, blue, silver or graphite.  Customers could activate it on a monthly plan or on prepaid, pay-per-use rates.  In both cases, SMS, mobile broadband, Caller ID and one ringtone per month were all complimentary features offered at no additional charge to Solo customers.

Over time, Solo began to imitate its competitors instead of offering unique, innovative options for wireless services.  Similarly to its competitor Fido, Solo offered per-second billing after the first minute of every month for postpaid customers starting in 2008.  Prepaid clients, however, receive per-minute billing.  The monthly plans for both prepaid and postpaid customers were practically identical to those of Koodo Mobile.

After Bell Canada acquired Virgin Mobile Canada (now Virgin Plus) on May 7, 2009, the Solo brand was given much less priority.  For example, Solo's former Rideau Centre store in Ottawa was replaced by a Virgin store.  Almost all of Bell's advertisements promote the Bell Mobility and Virgin Mobile brands, while Solo is promoted at the bare minimum.  On July 2 of that year, Mobile Syrup editor Kate O'Brien told readers to "start counting down the days [before] Solo Mobile is put to bed".  Solo only released a total of four feature phones throughout that year.

Gradual discontinuation (2010s-present)
Solo released the Samsung r100 feature phone on February 24, 2010.  Later, the LG 230 was launched by Solo on May 6 of that year.  This surprised Mobile Syrup editor Ian Hardy: "I thought Bell would have kicked Solo Mobile to the curb by now… [but they] somehow have kept Solo alive." Similarly, an editor from HowardChui noted: "The discount carrier [Solo Mobile] has basically been kept out of the spot light since Bell assumed full control over Virgin Mobile Canada."  Solo's first HSPA+ device, the LG Flick, was released on November 11, 2010.  In total, only five feature phones were released by Solo in 2010. 

Little effort was made in 2011 to promote the Solo brand, because its retail presence would be completely discontinued by Bell that year.  The carrier added the Samsung Gravity 3 to its lineup on March 16, more than seven months after the same device was released by Virgin Mobile Canada.  This meant that Solo now had nine different devices in its lineup.

Solo's main focus that year was to retain existing customers, not to gain new ones.  As such, they launched various offers available only to current customers, such as a one-time bonus of 100 minutes, a recurrent bonus of 50 minutes, or removing limits to local talk and international SMS.  On May 6, Solo permanently lowered the price on their two unlimited prepaid plans, matching Chatr's offering.  However, both plans would remain only available in the same cities as Chatr for Solo's limited selection of legacy CDMA devices, which was reduced to just the LG 230 by the end of the year.

During the summer season of that year, Solo discontinued sales of its products at Loblaw Companies and Zellers stores.  The MySolo customer portal was updated in the month of August in conjunction with a similar upgrade to its parent Bell Mobility's portal. Solo has made no offers for that year's back-to-school season to gain new customers.

The brand's first Android-powered smartphone, the Samsung Galaxy Gio, was launched after that period of time on October 13.  Solo was excluded from the iPhone 4S launch the following day, contrary to its parent Bell Mobility and Bell's brand Virgin Mobile Canada.  By the end of that month, Bell requested that stores ship back all unsold Solo Mobile feature phones, which were then flashed and rebranded to be sold by the Bell and Virgin brands during the Christmas and holiday season of that year.  Solo also missed out on the Galaxy Nexus, which Bell and Virgin both released on December 8.  Although nine devices were part of the lineup in March 2011, Solo Mobile ended the year with only three devices, all which cost much less when purchased from Bell or Virgin.

In March 2012, Solo Mobile quietly discontinued the Samsung Gravity 3. This left the carrier with only one feature phone and one smartphone in its lineup. The brand ceased providing new activations in May 2012.

Networks 

In the past, Solo Mobile only used Bell Mobility's CDMA network for both prepaid and postpaid customers.  , the LG 230 is the last and only device sold by Solo which supports this network.

On November 11, 2010, Solo adopted Bell's HSPA+ network.  On that day, the now-discontinued LG Flick was launched as the first Solo device compatible with this network. HSPA+ services, however, cannot be used by prepaid customers.  The LG Flick, the Samsung Gravity 3, plus the Samsung Galaxy 551, Gio and W are the only devices sold by Solo can access this network, although the operator previously sold SIM cards which allow any compatible HSPA+ handset to be used on the network.  On May 17, 2012, Solo allowed prepaid services on the HSPA+ network for existing customers.

Solo Mobile never used Bell's LTE network.

Products 

Now that its third party retail presence has officially ended, Solo Mobile only carries one feature phone and two smartphones for existing customers.  These same devices are available at a significantly lower price with Bell Mobility's newer mobile brand, Virgin Mobile Canada.

Over the years, Samsung Electronics was the main manufacturer for Solo Mobile's devices, and is currently the exclusive supplier of Solo feature phones and smartphones.  They have manufactured twenty Solo devices: seventeen feature phones in the past, plus three Android smartphones, two which are currently available.  Another notable manufacturer is Motorola Mobility, who has manufactured fourteen types of feature phones prior to Solo's renaissance.

Feature phones 
Solo Mobile currently only has one HSPA+ feature phone in its lineup: the LG F4NR.

Smartphones 
One Android smartphone is available at Solo Mobile.  It is the Moto G (3rd Gen).

Legacy products 
Released on March 16, 2011, the Samsung Gravity 3 is the only new feature phone Solo released in 2011.  It is one of only two HSPA+ feature phones offered by Solo, the other one being the LG Flick.  Both are now discontinued.

The BlackBerry Pearl 8130 is a legacy CDMA device which Solo carried until December 2011.  In comparison, Bell and Virgin cleared out all remaining stock of the 8130, plus the upgraded HSPA+ 9100, months before.  The 8130 can be upgraded to BlackBerry OS 4.5.0.101 and it also allows users to install compatible BlackBerry App World applications including BlackBerry Messenger (BBM).  Some apps, such as those for Canadian Tire and Shazam, require newer versions of the BlackBerry OS and are therefore incompatible with Solo's BlackBerry Pearl.

Services

Voice plans 
Currently, Solo's voice plans resemble those offered by Koodo Mobile and Virgin Mobile Canada, but with a few improvements.  All postpaid plans except for the one at $35/month have Canadian long-distance calling, while the $35/month postpaid plans and all prepaid plans only include local calls.  These plans are only available to existing customers as means of customer retention.

Legacy services 
Solo Mobile offered a 10-4 walkie-talkie service during the company's renaissance, from 2005 until mid-2009.  This was heavily promoted with the slogan "Cell Phone. Walkie talkie. Spread The Word."

Blabble is a Facebook application launched by Solo Mobile in September 2008. A photo tagging application, users could add quotes through speech bubbles onto photos within their existing Facebook albums.  As of August 2011, the application has been completely removed.

There previously were promotional rebates offered to customers who purchased a prepaid phone in store but activated it on a two-year postpaid contract.  With the end of Solo's third-party retail presence, such rebates are only available at the time of purchase, either on Solo's official website or in participating Bell stores.

To compete against Rogers Wireless' Chatr brand, Solo Mobile previously offered unlimited, prepaid, zone-based plans.  They were identical to Chatr's $25 and $35 plans, and availability was limited to CDMA devices activated in the same cities where Chatr is available.  No add-ons except for voicemail were available.  The plans are no longer available to new or existing customers, although current postpaid clients may subscribe to similar unlimited talk and text plans.

Criticism
Solo Mobile has been criticized for charging a system access fee on older plans.  They also charge a $3 fee for customer service via phone.

Advertising
Since 2003, Rethink Communications is Solo Mobile's advertising agency.  From 2005 until 2008, Solo Mobile advertised its Walkie talkie service.  Starting in 2007, Solo claimed to have the lowest rates in Canada.  Advertisements for this brand have been drastically reduced after Bell Canada purchased Virgin Mobile Canada on May 7, 2009.  Solo mainly depended on word of mouth, its own website and third-party retailers to promote its products.  The end of Solo Mobile's retail presence in October 2011 also meant that the brand would no longer advertise to new customers.

Solo Mobile was subject to criticism because one of its advertisements featured an antisemitic message.

Logo
The current logo, introduced on August 1, 2005, consists of the name Solo in orange written using dashed lines.

Slogans
 2005 : "Phone.  Walkie talkie.  Menace to society."
 2006 : "Cell phone.  Walkie talkie.  Spread the word."
 2007 : "Keep talking."
 2007-2010 : "Canada's most affordable rates."

Retail presence
Solo Mobile products and services were only available in British Columbia, Alberta, Ontario and Quebec, because Bell has a smaller presence in other provinces and all three territories. The brand no longer has its own corporate retail stores, given its decline, so products and services are sold in Bell Canada corporate stores instead.  Stores slowly decided to exclusively showcase the Bell Mobility brand, displaying nothing Solo-related.  At any Bell store, however, existing customers can still purchase a Solo SIM card, feature phone or smartphone as long as there is remaining stock.  The representatives at these stores also provide renewal and support for Solo Mobile.

Former retailers

Although Solo Mobile products and prepaid vouchers were previously available at some The Source locations, no postpaid activations were done, so customers had to purchase feature phones at its full retail price and then activate a postpaid month-to-month or prepaid service on their own.  This has led to store representatives comparing Solo to IKEA's ready-to-assemble furniture.  Additionally, only one-eighth of the mobile phones section displayed Solo products, while three-eighths were devoted to Virgin Mobile products and the remaining half were for Bell Mobility products.  Finally, store employees discouraged customers from choosing prepaid products, especially those offered by Solo Mobile, recommending postpaid service with the Bell and Virgin brands instead.  , Solo Mobile products are no longer available at The Source stores.  Remaining phones were shipped back to Bell's warehouse as per an order by this company.  The section that was previously reserved for Solo products has now been transformed to accommodate Virgin products instead.

In addition to Bell corporate stores, third-party Canadian dealers were also able to sell Solo prepaid feature phones.  , however, this is no longer the case, because Bell asked the retailers to ship back all Solo merchandise.  Previous retailers included Best Buy, Future Shop, Glentel, Loblaw-branded, Walmart and Zellers stores.  Only prepaid airtime for Solo can be purchased at these retailers.

See also 
 Bell Mobility
 Virgin Plus
 Lucky Mobile
 List of Canadian mobile phone companies

References

External links
 Official Solo Mobile website

Mobile phone companies of Canada
Mobile virtual network operators
Bell Canada
Telecommunications companies established in 2000
2000 establishments in Canada